Nick Ivanoff is the president & CEO of Ammann & Whitney. He was elected 2014-2015 chairman of American Road and Transportation Builders Association. He has presented testimony before United States Congress on Transportation and Infrastructure. He earned BS in Civil Engineering and MS in Traffic Engineering and
Transportation Planning, both from what is now called New York University Tandon School of Engineering.

References

Polytechnic Institute of New York University alumni
Living people
American businesspeople
Year of birth missing (living people)